Ángel Eduardo Zapata Praga (born 3 February 2001) is a Mexican professional footballer who plays as a defensive midfielder for Liga de Expansión MX club Raya2, on loan from Monterrey.

International career
Zapata was called up by Raúl Chabrand to participate with the under-21 team at the 2022 Maurice Revello Tournament, where Mexico finished the tournament in third place.

Career statistics

Club

Honours
Monterrey
CONCACAF Champions League: 2021

References

External links
 
 
 

Living people
2001 births
Mexican footballers
Mexico youth international footballers
Association football midfielders
C.F. Monterrey players
Liga de Expansión MX players
Liga MX players
Raya2 Expansión players
Footballers from Coahuila
Sportspeople from Saltillo